The Burkinabe ambassador in Bamako is the official representative of the Government in Ouagadougou to the Government of Mali.

List of representatives

References 

 
Mali
Burkina Faso